{{Infobox organization
| name = Canadian Medical Assistance Teams (CMAT)
| image = 
| type = Disaster Response; Emergency Management; Charitable organization
| tax_id = Canadian Charitable Registration #88439 3315 RR0001
| founded_date = 2008
| location = PO Box 35055 Ellerbeck Station, Toronto, Ontario, M4K 3P5 Canada
| phone = 416-305-0290
| key_people = Board ChairBrandon Duncan, RN(London, Ontario)Vice ChairCarolyn Davies, NP(Amherstburg, Ontario)Executive Director Valerie Rzepka, NP(Toronto, Ontario)Director of CommunicationsDr. Anthony Fong(Vancouver, British Columbia)Treasurer/ Secretary Nathan Blackstock, ACP(Vancouver, British Columbia)Director of LogisticsDavid Thanh(Squamish, British Columbia)Director at Large Christina Coambs(Barrie, Ontario)Director at Large Mikael Kjellström(Barriere, British Columbia)
| area_served = Canada and International
| focus = Disasters, Medical, Surgical, Humanitarian aid, Development and Recovery
| method = Medical, Major Trauma, Primary Health Care, Maternal/ Newborn
| num_volunteers = 1000+
| num_employees = 0
| non-profit_slogan = Helping the world at the time of disaster
| homepage = 
| Facebook page = 
| footnotes = Collaboration with Global Disaster Alert and Coordination System, Office for the Coordination of Humanitarian Affairs, United Nations International Strategy for Disaster Response, Canadian Forces, Sphere Project
}}Canadian Medical Assistance Teams (CMAT)''' is a Canadian grassroots, non profit disaster relief organization based in Brantford, Ontario, Canada. Through its medical relief and development projects, CMAT seeks to improve the health and welfare of families both in Canada and in developing countries around the world.

History
Canadian Medical Assistance Teams was established in 2004 in response to the 2004 Indian Ocean earthquake and tsunami as the medical arm of Canadian Relief Foundation. Two teams of paramedics from British Columbia and Saskatchewan were deployed to Banda Aceh, Indonesia to provide medical aid to the victims of the disaster. With lessons learned in Indonesia, CMAT prepared for further deployments.

Deployments
CMAT has a database of over 1000 health professionals from across Canada, one of its strengths is the ability to be flexible. CMAT is firmly dedicated to building capacity in the communities provided with assistance, and so any project which is initiated will only be in direct partnership with local authorities and with the support, guidance and permission of the host government.

2004 Indian Ocean earthquake and tsunami
The 2004 Indian Ocean earthquake and tsunami was the first time CMAT sent medical teams overseas.  Over the course of eight weeks, three Canadian medical teams consisting of paramedics and physicians were deployed to Indonesia, with the first team deploying within 10 days of disaster.  CMAT's medical team worked alongside teams from Mercy Malaysia and collaborated with Canadian consular officials from Jakarta, Indonesia and Kuala Lumpur, Malaysia to establish medical stations and administer medical care and first aid to displaced persons in Medan, Banda Aceh, and Meuloboh, Indonesia.

2005 Hurricane Katrina
On August 29, 2005, the Category 3 storm made landfall in southeast Louisiana. It caused severe destruction along the Gulf coast from central Florida to Texas, much of it due to the storm surge. CMAT deployed an assessment team to Baton Rouge, Louisiana. After three days in the Area of Operations (AOO) and completion of an on-ground tactical assessment, it was determined that CMAT's trauma team of physicians, trauma nurses and flight paramedics should not be deployed to the area. The two-member assessment team cited significant political infighting and substantial lack of command and control structure, which together posed serious problems for logistical support and basic information.

2005 Kashmir earthquake
On October 8, 2005, a major earthquake registered a moment magnitude of 7.6 in Azad Kashmir, near the city of Muzaffarabad in Pakistan. Occurring at 08:52:37 Pakistan Standard Time, it registered a moment magnitude of 7.6  The disaster destroyed 50% of the buildings in Muzaffarabad (including most of the official buildings) and is estimated to have killed up to 80,000 people in the Pakistani-controlled areas of Kashmir, alone. The severity of the damage caused by the earthquake is attributed to severe upthrust, coupled with poor construction.

CMAT focused its efforts in northern Pakistan, initially in Bagh and Muzaffarabad areas sending an assessment team from Canada on October 10, consisting of search and rescue, logistics and paramedics, as well as an emergency physician.  In addition, CMAT's staff in Kabul, Afghanistan conducted an assessment in affected areas in eastern Afghanistan.

This initial assessment team was followed by ten rotations of teams every three weeks, the second of which departed on October 21, 2005. The teams initially worked alongside members of the Rotary Club of Islamabad and Rawalpindi to deliver emergency medical relief, and assist and support medical staff at hospitals in Islamabad and Rawalpindi which had been deluged with quake victims airlifted from the field.  Subsequent teams were stationed in Muzaffarabad, working out of Abbass hospital, and in collaboration with the US Army's 212th Mobile Army Surgical Hospital (MASH) Hospital, and in Garhi Dopatta, working with the Canadian Forces Disaster Assistance Response Team (DART) Team, and United Nations Health Cluster.

On November 3, 2005, CMAT announced that it has been awarded over $190,000 in funding for two of its projects as part of the fund matching program through the Canadian International Development Agency (CIDA). The funds were sent to support medical teams in Muzzafferabad and other quake devastated areas.

2007 South Asian floods
The 2007 South Asian floods were a series of floods in India, Nepal, Bhutan, Pakistan and Bangladesh. News Agencies, citing the Indian and Bangladeshi governments, placed the death toll in excess of 2,000. By 3 August approximately 20 million had been displaced and by 10 August some 30 million people in India, Bangladesh and Nepal had been affected by flooding.

CMAT deployed a 2-member assessment team to Dhaka, Bangladesh to meet its local partner on August 18, 2007. According to CMAT assessment team, doctors and nurses were overwhelmed at the International Centre for Diarrhoeal Disease Research, Bangladesh hospital, as over 1800 patients were being seen every 24 hours with acute GI distress, typhoid, skin and eye infections and severe dehydration with outside temperatures reaching 33 degrees Celsius.

A four-member team consisting of advanced care paramedics and a nurse practitioner were deployed to Bangladesh, in collaboration with a local partner Fazlullah Foundation, and spent three weeks providing medical relief in Gopalganj District (Bangladesh), one of the most flood affected areas in Bangladesh alongside the Bangladesh Auxiliary Services for Social Advancement (BASSA).

CMAT also endorsed the activities of the Dhaka Project - a grassroots humanitarian project started by Ms. Maria Conceicao, a flight attendant for Emirates Airways. Conceicao was so moved by the plight of Dhaka's homelessness and poverty that she spearheaded the Dhaka Project, a program to alleviate homelessness, unemployment and disease through sustainable educational projects, employment training of men and women, nursery programs, and medical clinics. CMAT supported the project with a grant of US$8,000.

2008 Sichuan earthquake, China

CMAT deployed their assessment team to the province of Sichuan in China, where an earthquake measuring 7.8 on the Richter scale occurred on May 12, 2008 at approximately 14:00 local time. Reports indicated over 68,000 people died, including many school children trapped in collapsed school buildings.

The assessment team conducted an in-depth assessment of the region, partnering with contacts on the ground, and advised that the Chinese government, military and local Red Cross had done a commendable job in the rescue and recovery effort. With over 100,000 Chinese Military and over 1000 medical staff in the region, the most seriously injured citizens had already been evacuated to larger centres. CMAT's offer of providing medical teams to the area was declined by Government officials, and it was on their advice that CMAT has decided to immediately shift the focus of the relief effort in China. CMAT investigated other projects which were completed with donor funding.

In 2010, CMAT Chair visited the temporary home of the Mianyang Youxian District Special Education School, and presented a cheque for ¥85,000 (approx $12,500 CAD).

2010 Haiti earthquake, Haiti

A magnitude 7.0 quake with countless aftershocks struck the island nation of Haïti on January 12, 2010. Nearly 300,000 people perished in the highly populated Caribbean nation, and an assessment team was immediately deployed to the impoverished nation. The earthquake, centered 15 km from the capitol of Port-au-Prince caused tremendous devastation to vast areas of the country.

CMAT's initial assessment team conducted intense reconnaissance in the capitol and in the environs, meeting with United Nations officials, and other partner organizations. In collaboration with Canadian Armed Forces, CMAT based its field hospital operation in the city of Léogâne, approximately 35 southwest from Port-au-Prince.

Over the course of two months, CMAT's medical volunteers assessed and treated over 10,000 patients, performed hundreds of surgeries, and delivered approximately 20 babies.  In March 2010, CMAT wrapped up its operations in Léogâne, and transitioned its medical teams to Pétion-Ville, working in partnership with J/P Haitian Relief Organization, a non-governmental organization founded by actor Sean Penn.  Teams of volunteers rotated through an additional four months.

In partnership with the York Region District School Board, approximately $75,000 was raised directly for CMAT's relief effort.

2010 Chile earthquake
A powerful 8.8 magnitude quake and ensuing tsunamis struck the area on February 27, 2010. Over 700 people were confirmed dead, and countless others were injured.

In response to the Chilean government's international appeal for aid, Canadian Medical Assistance Teams deployed its initial disaster assessment team to Concepción, Chile to conduct a needs assessment and ascertain the level of devastation, destroyed infrastructure and health needs of the quake affected people.

After meeting with Chilean officials, in Concepción, the decision was made stand down deployment. This decision was made as a direct result of the Chilean Government and Military's exceptional response to the earthquake.

The assessment team found that the need for medical aid was decreasing on a daily basis, any victims with traumatic injuries had been evacuated to major medical centres in other regions of the country, and thus the recommendation to stand down was made.

2010 Pakistan floods
In the late summer of 2010, major flooding from monsoon rains killed up to 1,500 people, put over 100,000 at risk for disease and displaced more than 3.2 million in central Pakistan. The threat of water-borne diseases rapidly rose and millions of people were homeless or cut off in their villages because of the heavy monsoon rains and flooding.

CMAT received word from its Pakistani partners on the ground, reporting that rescue workers are struggling to aid the millions of people affected, especially those in far-flung villages. CMAT members were familiar with the region, having responded and provided medical relief after the devastating earthquake of October, 2005.

The 2010 monsoon season which started on July 27 brought the worst flooding in Pakistan in living memory, causing widespread damage and making many communities inaccessible due to destroyed roads and collapsed bridges. Khyber Pakhtoonkhwa (KPK) (especially many areas of Swat District), Baluchistan and Punjab were the worst-affected areas. Thousands of people lost their homes and livelihoods, officials from Save the Children and Pakistan Red Crescent have reported.

Flood hit areas of Swat had limited access to health services. A number of health facilities in certain locations, were completely destroyed. Furthermore, as many were cut off from main towns in Swat, communities were unable to access health services when needed, while others were able access health facilities with some difficulties. However, most communities reported that injured and sick community members did not receive any medical treatment. Pregnant women in particular were facing problems in accessing health services. The most prevalent ailments were diarrhea, respiratory infections, skin diseases and fever.

As floodwaters moved through Sindh Province, additional flooding occurred in low-lying areas, and the incidence of disease swiftly increased. Canadian Medical Assistance Teams deployed its initial disaster assessment team to Sindh Province, Pakistan from Toronto on September 5, 2010. The assessment surveyed the health needs of displaced flood victims in order to prepare for the deployment of CMAT's inflatable field hospital and rotations of medical teams. The five member team  begun its assessment of the southern part of Sindh Province, worked in the town of Thatta. The town was one of the worst flooded districts of Pakistan, as the sea was on high tide when flooded river water reached it, multiplying the damage drastically. By late August, 175,000 people had left their homes and were camping along the sides of the main road under the open sky.

Three primary health care teams were sent to Sindh province, and indicated that the majority of illnesses were primary care related - such as skin infections, respiratory infections, eye infections, and gastrointestinal illnesses. CMAT also provided mobile medical clinics to the outlying areas, to target women and children who would otherwise be unable to access health services. In collaboration with Pakistani Federal and Provincial authorities, and other NGO partners on the ground, the team also identified an area in Sukkur, Sindh Province, approximately a 500 km north of Karachi. The immediate vicinity is home to 5-6 internally displace persons (IDP) camps, with population of several thousand. CMAT volunteers treated more than 500 patients per week in the field clinic in collaboration with local partner V Need U.

2011 Tōhoku earthquake and tsunami, Japan
The largest earthquake in Japan's recorded history struck offshore on March 11, and police found as many as 300 bodies in the north-eastern coastal area that bore the brunt of the tremors and ensuing tsunami. The earthquake struck at 2:46 p.m. local time at a depth of 10 kilometres about 125 kilometres off the eastern coast, and was followed by at least 19 powerful aftershocks.

CMAT's Rapid Assessment Team was activated, and conducted a needs assessment in the Miyagi Prefecture, around the city of Sendai to ascertain the level of devastation. This assessment included evaluating the destroyed infrastructure and surveying the health needs of the earthquake and tsunami affected victims in order to prepare for the potential deployment of CMAT's inflatable field hospital.

NGO airlift support had been temporarily suspended pending the further assessment of the situation at the Fukushima Nuclear Plant.  CMAT Directors spoke with Canadian Nuclear Officials who stated: "Standard Personal Protective Equipment (PPE: coveralls, masks, gloves) would be adequate if they had to go inside the evacuated area, but at 100+ km away, no one would have received a significant radiation dose, even at Chernoble."  The Canadian Nuclear Official was also confident that only small amounts of radioactive material were recently released in Japan, and in a controlled manner.

CMAT re-deployed with medical volunteers who were trained in CBRNE (chemical, biological, radiological, nuclear and explosive) events.  CBRNE events refer to the uncontrolled release of chemicals, biological agents or radioactive contamination into the environment or explosions that cause widespread damage. CMAT Team members who deployed to Japan will have been trained in CBRNE capabilities, common standards, policies and protective equipment.  Working with guidance from experts at the Centre for Excellence in Emergency Preparedness, under Canadian Nuclear Safety Commission guidelines and using principles from the CBRNE strategy, all CMAT team members who deployed to Japan were equipped with personal protective equipment, such as dosimeters, and radiation detectors. Other personal protective equipment which the teams will carried included a full supply of Tyvek coveralls, nitrile gloves, protective eyewear, shoe covers and masks, generously donated by a supplier partner.

The team made their way to Ishinomaki, a small coastal town north of Sendai in the Miyagi prefecture. They spent a chilly and rocky night, with several aftershocks ranging from 5.0 to 6.6 and spent the day assessing the devastated area, where search and rescue missions are still going on, and attended a briefing meeting. Several of the members spent time working in a recovery centre, where there were quite a few patients.

A 5-member strike team collaborated with the Japanese military in the coastal town of Onagawa, approximately 15 km east of Ishinomaki and were asked to assist with the search and recovery of victims in this small community which was flattened by the tsunami. Working their way through broken homes, rubble and bamboo forests, the team reported that in this area the waves were well over 100 feet high and deposited debris into the branches of tall trees. Of the estimated 15,000 people who lived in this community before the tsunami, only about 300 survived the disaster.

The situation in Japan was reminiscent of CMAT's first deployment in response to the Indian Ocean tsunami of 2004. Just like Indonesia, countless numbers of people in Japan perished in the disaster, and those who did survive, escaped largely unharmed. The medical team visited evacuation centres provided primary medical care and first aid to some of the evacuees, as the few patients who survived with major or significant injuries had already been evacuated. Many of the patients that the team saw were elderly, and had chronic illnesses like diabetes and high blood pressure.

Meanwhile, other members of the team were awaiting delivery of the Nomad water purification unit. The purchase of this portable water purification system manufactured by Noah Water Systems was made possible through the generous support of our donors, especially the Lotus Light Charity Society from Vancouver, and the "Helping Hands" program run by the York Region District School Board. The unit is capable of producing 25 gallons / 95 litres per minute or 36,000 gallons / 136,800 liters per day and will satisfy the need for large volumes of safe drinking water using any fresh water source: well, lake, river, stream, and pond and even polluted floodwaters.

The Nomad unit  was delivered to the team in Ishinomaki in collaboration with the Japanese military, and the decision was made to place the Nomad in the community of Kitakamicho Aikawa, a small fishing village of about 1000 people, which was completely destroyed by the tsunami. The unit supplied the whole community with safe drinking water as the water reservoir and most of the water supply infrastructure was washed away in the tsunami. Local authorities and military estimated that it would take at least six months before the system is back up and running again. The nomad supplied water for the community during the period of reconstruction.

2015 Nepal 
They deployed to Nepal in 2015 where they also assisted with the rescue of Canadian yoga teacher Tamara McLeod.

2017 Hurricane Irma, Caribbean 
In 2017 CMAT responded to Hurricane Irma in the Caribbean.

Educational opportunities
Sphere Project

References

External links
Canadian Medical Assistance Teams
http://reliefweb.int/node/341816

Medical and health organizations based in Ontario